The Han campaigns against Minyue were a series of three Han military campaigns dispatched against the Minyue state. The first campaign was in response to Minyue's invasion of Eastern Ou in 138 BC. In 135 BC, a second campaign was sent to intervene in a war between Minyue and Nanyue. After the campaign, Minyue was partitioned into Minyue, ruled by a Han proxy king, and Dongyue. Dongyue was defeated in a third military campaign in 111 BC and the former Minyue territory was annexed by the Han Empire.

Background

The Qin dynasty's military incursions in the south of what is now China began a period of expansion that continued under the next dynasty, the Han.  After the fall of the Qin, Minyue was established in 202 BC, and Eastern Ou in 192 BC, with the support of the Han. They were rewarded with greater autonomy in return for their contributions to the revolt against the Qin. The local rulers of the Minyue region had also sided with Liu Bang's Han instead of Xiang Yu's Chu during the Chu–Han Contention, a civil war that ensued during the collapse of the Qin.

Minyue was created by carving out the former Qin province of Minzhong, with Dongye as the capital, into a new kingdom ruled by Zou Wuzhu. A decade later, Zou Yao was granted control over Donghai, popularly referred to as Eastern Ou after the name of the kingdom's capital. The title was bestowed with a declaration by the Han emperor that "Zou Yan, the chief of Min, achieved great merit and his people supported the Han cause". The Han historian Sima Qian claims both rulers were descendants of Goujian, the 5th century BC ruler of Yue. The family had lost their status as rulers during the Qin's wars of unification, when they were demoted to local chieftains.

Han–Minyue wars

Intent of Minyue
While Minyue invasion of its neighbours appears to be a "spontaneous whim of a foolhardy and greedy king Zou Ying" in the Han dynasty history books, given the geopolitical circumstances, Brindley (2015) wrote that "We should therefore consider Minyue aggression in the 130s in terms of a series of pre-emptive, southerly strikes intended to stave off Han encroachment and potential takeover".

Initial military intervention

In 138 BC, Minyue invaded the Eastern Ou, prompting Eastern Ou to request the intervention of Han forces. The Han court was divided over offering military support. The campaign was opposed by the Han commander-in-chief Tian Fen, who argued that warfare between the Yue tribes occurred frequently and the affairs of Yue were not the responsibility of the Han government. The concept of Chinese centrality among nations persuaded the court to dispatch an army. In accordance with Chinese political philosophy, the ruler or Son of Heaven held a mandate that obligated the emperor to help smaller countries in need. Otherwise, as the Han official Zhuang Zhu phrased it, "how could we treat the myriad kingdoms as our children?"

A Han naval force led by Zhuang Zhu departed from Shaoxing in northern Zhejiang towards Minyue. The Minyue surrendered before the arrival of the Han troops, and withdrew from Eastern Ou. There were plans to move the residents of Eastern Ou to the area between the Huai River and Yangtze River, following a request by the king of Eastern Ou.

Second intervention

In 135 BC, war broke out when Minyue invaded Nanyue. Zhao Mo, the king of Nanyue, asked for and received the military assistance of the Han. In 180 BC, Zhao had offered to submit as a vassal and the Han agreed, a decision that was partly based on Zhao's ancestral roots in northern China. An army led by the generals Wang Hui and Han Anguo was ordered to invade Minyue. The campaign was cut short by palace infighting in the Minyue court. Panicked at news of an invasion, the younger brother of the Minyue king Zou Ying, Zou Yushan, conspired with the royal court to depose Ying. Yushan killed his brother with a spear, decapitated the corpse, and sent the head to Wang. The Han forces withdrew soon after.

Zhao Mo was grateful for the speed of the intervention against Minyue. The Han official Zhuang Zhu was dispatched to meet with the Nanyue emperor, who expressed his gratitude. Zhao sent his son, the prince Zhao Yingqi, to the Han capital at Chang'an, where he was to work for the Emperor. In the aftermath of the campaign, Minyue had split into a dual monarchy, Minyue and Dongyue. Minyue was controlled by the Han through a proxy ruler, while Dongyue was independently ruled by Zou Yushan, the brother who deposed the former king during the invasion.

Zou Chou was selected to fill the role of Han proxy ruler because he was the only member of the Minyue royal family who refused to take part in the war against Nanyue. However, his efforts to exert control over the people of Minyue were not successful. The subjects of the kingdom pledged their loyalty to Zou Yushan instead. Yushan declared himself king of Minyue without the consent of the Emperor Wu, the Han ruler. The emperor was informed of Yushan's actions, and recognized him as king of Dongyue instead of ordering a second invasion. Emperor Wu considered it a reward to Yushan for killing Zou Ying and ending the war. The assassination had prevented the Han from wasting any more resources on the conflict. Dongyue had an uneasy relationship with the Han. In 112 BC, Han officials were killed in a military engagement with Dongyue.

Third campaign and conquest

As Han troops returned from the Han–Nanyue War in 111 BC, the Han government debated annexing Dongyue. Dongyue, under King Zou Yushan, had agreed to assist the Han campaign against Nanyue, but the Dongyue army never reached Nanyue. Yushan blamed the delay on the weather. The proposal to annex Dongyue was suggested by General Yang Pu, but was dismissed by Emperor Wu. The naval force arrived home without having attacked Dongyue. Zou caught wind of Yang's request, and responded by revolting against the Han. Han forces were led by General Han Yue, General Yang Pu, commander Wang Wenshu, and two marquises of Yue ancestry. The army crushed the rebellion and captured Dongyue in the last months of 111 BC, placing the former Minyue territory under Han rule.

Historical records report that Minyue and Dongyue were emptied of people, and that its residents were deported to the territories between the Huai River and the Yangtze River. The alleged population transfer was a resumption of a policy that had been planned since 138 BC. The Han government considered the mountainous region difficult to control and was wary of trusting its residents. Modern historians doubt the event happened. The deportation of an entire kingdom is implausible, and nothing has been found to verify a migration of Han settlers to the Minyue region around the year 1, something that would have occurred had the area been abandoned while under Han control. There was only one town of Han settlers, Dongyue, in Minyue. Dongyue was built where the Min River meets the sea, around the time of Emperor Wu's reign. It is more likely that the assimilation of Minyue into Han Chinese culture through Han conquest happened later in the dynasty.

Historical significance
From one settlement in year 1, the Han Dynasty's involvement in the Minyue region grew into several counties. There were many Chinese counties in the area by the 4th century AD. The Minyue had been culturally assimilated by the time the Han Dynasty collapsed, and Chinese civilization was undergoing a transition to the Three Kingdoms period of Cao Wei, Shu Han, and Eastern Wu. Political upheaval in the north, such as Wang Mang's usurpation, had caused Han migrants to resettle in the south. The Han Dynasty's military expansion widened its commercial ties in addition acquiring large amounts of new territories. The empire's conquest of Minyue and Nanyue spoke of its vast size that it bordered the ancient kingdoms of Southeast Asia. Economic ties with the Han and subsequent dynasties affected the trajectory of maritime trade of Southeast Asia, where goods have been excavated made in styles resembling that of the ancient Han Chinese. Maritime trade and the Silk Road also linked China with Ancient Rome, India, and the Near East.

Citations

Bibliography

 
 
 
 

110 BC
135 BC
138 BC
130s BC conflicts
110s BC conflicts
2nd century BC in China
Campaigns of the Han dynasty
Emperor Wu of Han
History of Fujian
Wars involving the Han dynasty